Georges Ba (born 21 January 1979) is an Ivorian former professional footballer who played as a striker.

Career
Georges Ba has played for a number of clubs in France and also for Israel's Maccabi Netanya.  He traveled to England in early 2008 for a trial with Leeds United, and on 29 March 2008 instead joined another League One side, Gillingham, on a deal which ran until the end of the 2007–08 season.  He made his Gillingham debut in a 2–1 home win against Luton Town on 1 April, but he was released at the end of the season after four games for the Kent-based club, and rejoined Maccabi Netanya.
On 17 December he was released from his contract with Netanya for the second time. He has since returned to France. and  recently moved to America to start his own professional soccer training business. He coached an Under-16 team called Capistrano FC, from San Juan Capistrano.

Current

Georges Ba runs a Professional Soccer Training Business in Irvine, California,  as of February 2019.

Honours
Championnat de France amateur (1):
2010-11
Réunion Premier League (1):
2012
Réunion Premier League - 2012 Top Goalscorer (9 goals)

References

  5.KAAI TECH LLC

External links
 https://georgesba.soccer (Official Website)

1979 births
Living people
Ivorian footballers
Tours FC players
Racing Besançon players
OGC Nice players
Montpellier HSC players
Le Mans FC players
ES Troyes AC players
AC Ajaccio players
Maccabi Netanya F.C. players
Vendée Poiré-sur-Vie Football players
Ivory Coast international footballers
Ivorian expatriate footballers
Expatriate footballers in France
Expatriate footballers in Israel
Gillingham F.C. players
Ligue 1 players
Entente SSG players
Ligue 2 players
Footballers from Abidjan
Association football forwards
SS Saint-Louisienne players